Ruleta (Spanish "roulette") may refer to:

Music
Ruleta, opera by Enric Palomar (1998)
Ruleta Rusa (es), album by Joaquin Sabina (1984)
Ruleta Rusa, album by Annette Moreno (2004)
"Ruleta" (Danna Paola song)
"Ruleta" (Inna song)
"Ruleta", song by Los Piojos from Verde paisaje del Infierno
"Ruleta", Slovenian song by Modus from The Best of 1979–1988: Vol 2

See also
La ruleta de la fortuna, Spanish version of TV's Wheel of Fortune
IWRG Ruleta de la Muerte type of professional wrestling tournament
Ruleta de la Muerte (1998) professional wrestling Pay-Per-View event
Ruleta de la Muerte (1999) professional wrestling Pay-Per-View event
IWRG Ruleta de la Muerte (2009)
IWRG Ruleta de la Muerte (2012)
IWRG Ruleta de la Muerte (2013)
IWRG Ruleta de la Muerte (April 2015)
IWRG Ruleta de la Muerte (November 2015)